Tyrini is a tribe of rove beetle.

Subtribes
 Centrophthalmina
 Janusculina
 Somatipionina
 Tyrina

References
Wikispecies entry

Beetle tribes
Pselaphitae